Bagram Airfield-BAF, also known as Bagram Air Base , is located  southeast of Charikar in the Parwan Province of Afghanistan. It is under the Afghan Ministry of Defense. The main one measures , capable of handling large military aircraft, including the Lockheed Martin C-5 Galaxy. The second runway measures . The air base also has at least three large hangars, a control tower, numerous support buildings, and various housing areas.

Bagram Air Base was formerly the largest U.S. military base in Afghanistan, staffed by the 455th Air Expeditionary Wing of the U.S. Air Force, along with rotating units of the U.S. and coalition forces. It was expanded and modernized by the Americans. There is also a hospital with 50 beds, three operating theatres and a modern dental clinic.

On 15 August 2021, the entire base fell to Taliban rebel forces after the NATO-trained Afghan Army had surrendered. All prisoners at the Parwan Detention Facility were released. The International Committee of the Red Cross had revealed that since August 2009 it was informed about inmates of a second prison where detainees are held in isolation and without access to the International Red Cross that is usually guaranteed to all prisoners; the existence of a second prison was denied by U.S. authorities.

History

Bagram airfield was originally built during the early period of the Cold War, at a time when the United States and the neighboring Soviet Union were spreading political influence in Afghanistan. While the United States was focusing on Afghanistan, the Soviets were strengthening ties with Fidel Castro's regime in Cuba. In 1959, a year after Afghan Prime Minister Daud Khan toured the United States, U.S. President Dwight Eisenhower landed at Bagram Airfield where he was greeted by King Zahir Shah and Daud Khan among other Afghan officials.

The original runway, was built in 1976. The airport at Bagram was maintained by the Afghan Air Force (AAF) with some support from the United States. During the 1980s Soviet–Afghan War, it played a key role, serving as a base of operations for troops and supplies. Bagram was also the initial staging point for the invading Soviet forces at the beginning of the conflict, with elements of two Soviet Airborne Troops' divisions being deployed there. Aircraft based at Bagram, including the 368th Assault Aviation Regiment flying Su-25s, provided close air support for Soviet and Afghan troops in the field. The 368th Assault Aviation Regiment was stationed at Bagram from October 1986 to November 1987.

Some of the Soviet land forces based at Bagram included the 108th Motor Rifle Division and the 345th Independent Guards Airborne Regiment of the 105th Guards Airborne Division. Following the withdrawal of the Soviet forces and the rise of the Western-funded and Pakistani-trained mujahideen rebels, Afghanistan plunged into civil war. Many of its support buildings and base housing built by the Soviet Armed Forces during their occupation were destroyed by years of fighting between various warring Afghan factions after the Soviets left.

Control of the base was contested from 1999 onward between the Northern Alliance and Taliban, often with each controlling territory on opposite ends of the airfield. Taliban forces were consistently within artillery and mortar range of the field, denying full possession of the strategic facility to the Northern Alliance. Press reports indicated that at times a Northern Alliance general was using the bombed-out control tower as an observation post and as a location to brief journalists, with his headquarters nearby.

Reports also indicated that Northern Alliance rocket attacks on Kabul had been staged from Bagram, possibly with Russian-made FROG-7 Rockets. In 2000, the Taliban took over control and forced the Northern Alliance to retreat further to the north.

21st century

During the US-led invasion of Afghanistan, the base was secured by a team from the United Kingdom's Special Boat Service. By early December 2001 troops from the 10th Mountain Division shared the base with Special Operations Command officers from MacDill Air Force Base in Florida, Paratroopers of the 82nd Airborne Division from Fort Bragg, and a small communications team consisting of personnel from the 269th Signal Company, 11th Signal Brigade out of Fort Huachuca. The British force consisted of B and C Companies from 40 Commando, Royal Marines. As of mid-December 2001 more than 300 U.S. troops, mainly with the 10th Mountain Division, were providing force protection at Bagram. The troops patrolled the base perimeter, guarded the front gate, and cleared the runway of explosive ordnance. As of early January 2002, the number of 10th Mountain Division troops had grown to about 400 soldiers.

There were numerous dining facilities at Bagram Airfield. Troops and civilians had various dining options that included Pizza Hut, Subway, an Afghan restaurant, as well as Green Beans coffee shops.

In late January 2002, there were somewhere around 4,000 U.S. troops in Afghanistan, of which about 3,000 were at Kandahar International Airport, and about 500 were stationed at Bagram.  The runway began to be repaired by US, Italian, and Polish military personnel. By mid-June 2002, Bagram Airfield was serving as home to more than 7,000 U.S. and other armed services. Numerous tent areas housed the troops based there, including one named Viper City. It was reported that "Bagram came under daily rocket attack" in 2002 even though most of these attacks went unreported by the press. Landmines were also a serious concern in and around Bagram Airfield.

By late 2003 B-huts,  structures made of plywood designed to hold eight troops, were replacing the standard shelter option for troops. There were several hundred, with plans to build close to 800 of them. The plans were to have nearly 1,200 structures built by 2006, but completion of the project was expected much earlier; possibly by July 2004. The increased construction fell under U.S. Central Command standards of temporary housing and allowed for the building of B-huts on base, not to show permanence, but to raise the standard for troops serving here. The wooden structures had no concrete foundation and thus were not considered permanent housing, just an upgrade from the tents, the only option Bagram personnel and troops had seen previously. The small homes offered troops protection from environmental conditions including wind, snow, sand and cold. During 2005, a USO facility was built and named after former pro football player and United States Army Ranger, Pat Tillman.

This new runway is  longer than the previous one and  thicker, giving it the ability to land larger aircraft, such as the C-5 Galaxy, C-17 Globemaster III, Il-76, An-124, An-225 or the Boeing 747 (which is used by civilian cargo airlines).

By 2007 Bagram had become the size of a small town, with traffic jams and many commercial shops selling goods from clothes to food. Due to the height and snowstorms commercial aircraft have difficulty landing there, and older aircraft often rely on very experienced crews in order to be able to land there. The base was able to house 10,000 troops in 2009.

The 2007 Bagram Airfield bombing was a suicide attack that killed up to 23 people and injured 20 more, at a time when Dick Cheney, then Vice-President of the United States, was visiting Afghanistan. The attack occurred inside one of the security gates surrounding the heavily guarded base. Yousef Ahmadi, one of the Taliban spokesmen, claimed responsibility for the attack and said that Cheney was the intended target. Another Taliban spokesman later confirmed that Osama Bin Laden planned the attack, and reiterated that Cheney was the intended target. This claim is supported by the relatively limited number of large suicide bombings carried out in Afghanistan, combined with the intensity of this particular attack, and the fact that Cheney was at the base. Cheney was unharmed from the attack, however. Among the dead were a U.S. soldier, a U.S. contractor, a South Korean soldier, and 20 Afghan workers at the base.

In 2008, several U.S. service members were accused of accepting bribes for the award of building contracts on Bagram. Four of the Afghans have also faced charges, while three of them have been held as material witnesses. The GI's are reported to have received over 100,000 dollars in bribes.

In March 2009, a car bomb exploded outside the gates of Bagram Airfield facilities, wounding three civilian workers. In June 2009, two U.S. soldiers were killed and at least six other personnel were wounded during an early morning rocket attack.

In October 2009 The State reported on Bagram's expansion. It reported that Bagram was currently undergoing US$200 million expansion projects, and called the Airfield a "boom town". According to the article: "Official U.S. policy is not to create a permanent occupation force in Afghanistan. But it is clear from what's happening at Bagram Airfield—the Afghan end of the Charleston-to-Afghanistan lifeline—that the U.S. military won't be packing up soon." In November 2009, construction of the Parwan Detention Facility was completed. It housed about 3,000 inmates, mostly insurgents who were fighting against Afghanistan and NATO-led forces.

In March 2010, the U.S. Air Force (USAF) installed 150 solar powered lights to address reports of sexual assaults at the base. Eight reported sexual assaults occurred at the base in 2009 involving Airmen; the U.S. Army's sexual assault response team reported treating 45 victims in 2009. The report revealed that most victims knew their attacker.

In March 2010, insurgents attacked an area at the base with rockets. One of the rockets landed next to a B-Hut in a camp located on the west side of the base killing a Bosnian national, who was working at Bagram as a contract firefighter.

In May 2010, a group of "nearly a dozen" insurgents attacked around the north end of the base. The assault left one U.S. contractor dead while nine service members were reported wounded. A spokesman for Bagram said a building was slightly damaged during the attack. Taliban spokesman claimed 20 armed men wearing suicide vests attacked the base with four detonating explosives at the entrances, but the military spokesman said they failed "to breach the perimeter" and were "unable to detonate their suicide vests." The attackers were dressed in U.S. Army uniforms.

Early on the morning of 30 December 2010, Taliban militants fired two rockets on Bagram though no casualties were reported. The insurgents claimed responsibility for the incident. After the 2012 Afghanistan Quran burning protests the United States decided to transfer the running of the Parwan Detention Facility to Afghan National Security Forces (ANSF), although the Americans continued to have access to the facility and veto power over the release of inmates.

On 18 June 2013, the base was the subject of a mortar attack by Taliban forces, which resulted in four U.S. troops being killed and several others wounded. On Thanksgiving evening in 2013, a rocket attack killed 2 civilian contractors as they slept in their B hut on the southern part of the field.

On 28 November 2019, U.S. President Donald Trump visited the Bagram Airfield for the first time to celebrate Thanksgiving with the U.S. troops there.

As part of the US withdrawal from Afghanistan, after nearly 20 years of continuous U.S. presence at the site, the Bagram Air Base was secretly evacuated by the US during the night on 1 July 2021 and de facto handed back to the Afghan government on 2 July 2021. 
The last remaining U.S. troops left the base by shutting off the electricity and slipping away in the night without notifying the Afghan Armed Forces. The base was looted by local civilians soon after U.S. forces left the area. The Afghan National Army later took control of the area and arrested some looters.

On 15 August 2021, Afghan troops stationed there gave up their positions to the Taliban, losing control of the airfield.

Camp Vance

Camp Vance, Afghanistan was the base, 1.4 km from the airfield, established in December 2002 by the United States Department of Defense to headquarter the Combined Joint Special Operations Task Force (CJSOTF).

The camp was named for Gene Arden Vance Jr., a member of the U.S. Special Forces and a cryptologic linguist who, despite being critically wounded, helped save the lives of two fellow Americans and 18 Afghan soldiers during the hunt for Osama Bin Laden in the War in Afghanistan.

Camp Vance was headquartered by U.S. Special Forces troops whose core tasks included advising the Afghan National Army’s special operations forces and local police, training forces associated with the Village Stability Operations (VSO) and counterinsurgency (COIN). The camp also housed highly specialized battalion-level task forces built around Army Special Forces, infantry, a Marine special operations battalion, and a Navy SEAL team.

Parwan Detention Facility

The Parwan Detention Facility (PDF) was completed in 2009 and is located at Bagram Airfield. It was the main detention facility for persons detained by U.S. forces in Afghanistan. The older detention facility, which was located at a different site, has been criticized in the past for alleged torture and prisoner abuse. In 2005, The New York Times reported that two detainees had been beaten to death by guards in December 2002. Amnesty International used the word "torture" to describe treatment at the detention center.

Apart from military and intelligence personnel, the only people officially allowed inside the prison building were Red Cross representatives who inspected the facility once every two weeks. It was reported in February 2009 that detainees had no access to any legal process. Many of the officers and soldiers interviewed by U.S. Army investigators in the subsequent criminal investigation said the large majority of detainees were compliant and reasonably well treated. However, some interrogators routinely administered harsh treatment which included alleged beatings, sleep deprivation, sexual humiliation, shackling to ceilings, and threats with guard dogs. Amnesty International has criticized the U.S. government for using dogs in this way at the detention center.

In 2005, the number of anti-American militants held at Bagram was 450, but began increasing then. In the same year, four al-Qaeda militants escaped from Bagram detention center. To address the mounting human rights violations and the 2005 escape incident, the U.S. decided to build a more modern detention facility.  more than 3,000 alleged militants and foreign terrorists were detained at PDF, roughly 18 times as many as in Guantanamo Bay. The number increased 5-fold since President Barack Obama took office in January 2009. The detainees included senior members of al-Qaeda and Taliban militant commanders. In 2012, the Afghan government requested that control of the Parwan Detention Facility be handed over to the Afghan National Security Forces (ANSF).

Incidents and accidents

The Danish Air Force pilot was evacuated to a U.S. Army hospital.
 25 December 2002: A C-130 ran off the runway, closing the runway for a 24-hour period. There were no injuries. 
 20 April 2003: A C-17 landed on part of the runway that was closed due to construction: The C-17 suffered over $2 million in main landing gear damage. There were no injuries.
 Alleged prisoner abuse at Bagram by U.S. personnel was the subject of the 2007 Academy Award-winning documentary Taxi to the Dark Side. The film details the severe beatings and torture, and ultimate death, of an Afghan taxi driver being held at the Parwan Detention Facility.
 27 February 2007: A suicide bombing at the outer gate of the base left at least 23 people dead and injured 20 others.
 10 August 2007: A U.S. CH-47 Chinook s/n 83-24123 while on the ground at Bagram Airfield, taxied into another parked CH-47D aircraft (84-24182) and was severely damaged. There were no fatalities. The aircraft was written off.
 8 August 2008: United Arab Emirates Air Force C-130 Hercules (S/N 1212) overran the runway and caught fire. The plane was partially salvaged. 
 21 October 2008: A United States Navy P-3 Orion reconnaissance and intelligence aircraft overshot the runway while landing. The aircraft caught fire and was destroyed but the only injury to the crew was one broken ankle. The aircraft was from PATWING 5 from Naval Air Station Brunswick and was assigned to CTF-57 in Afghanistan 
 1 March 2010: An ACT Airlines Airbus A300 TC-ACB sustained substantial damage when the port main landing gear did not extend and lock out completely. It then collapsed on landing forcing the aircraft to veer off the runway. The aircraft was a write-off and was scrapped within 4 days of the crash.
 10 June 2011: French Army Gazelle Viviane crashed about 20 kilometres (12 mi) from Bagram in the north of the country in difficult weather conditions. One person died and the pilot was seriously injured.
 29 April 2013: National Airlines Flight 102 was a Boeing 747 that crashed on takeoff killing all 7 American crew members. The crash was recorded by the dashboard video camera of an approaching vehicle.
 21 December 2015: A suicide bomber on a motorcycle killed 6 U.S. troops in an attack near the base.
 12 November 2016: A suicide bomber managed to enter the Air Force base, killing at least 4 Americans and injuring 17 others. U.S. and Afghan forces pledged an investigation on the matter.
11 December 2019: An Afghan suicide bomber hit an under construction medical facility near the base. Two Afghan civilians were killed and 80 were wounded.
 9 April 2020: Five rockets hit the base with no casualties reported. The Taliban denied responsibility and Daesh claimed responsibility.
 5 July 2022: A missile struck the base, killing six Taliban members and wounding two. The missile was fired by the Afghanistan Freedom Front.

See also
 Camp Leatherneck
 Camp Marmal
 International Security Assistance Force
 Kandahar International Airport
 List of airports in Afghanistan
 Transit Center at Manas (Manas Air Base)
 War in Afghanistan order of battle, 2012
 2019 Bagram Airfield attack

References

External links

 455th AEW's Bagram Airfield Official Site

Airports in Afghanistan
Installations of the United States Air Force in Afghanistan
Military installations of the United States in Afghanistan
Prisoner-of-war camps
Soviet Air Force bases
Afghanistan–Soviet Union relations
United States Army airfields
War in Afghanistan (2001–2021)
United States Marine Corps in the War in Afghanistan (2001–2021)
Military installations of Afghanistan
Military installations of the Soviet Union in other countries